Haza may refer to:

Places
 Haza, Province of Burgos, a town in Castile and León, Spain

People
 Ahmed Muhammed Haza Al Darbi, Saudi Arabian prisoner at Guantanamo Bay
 Hisui Haza (born 1996), Japanese footballer
 Ivonne Haza (1938–2022), Dominican soprano
 Ofra Haza, Israeli singer
 Óscar Haza, American journalist
 Plutarco Haza, Mexican actor

Science
 Haza (butterfly), a genus of skipper butterflies in the subtribe Moncina

See also
 Paolo de la Haza (born 1983), Peruvian footballer 
 Marta Hazas (born 1977), Spanish actress